The 1928 Summer Student World Championships, was the fourth editions of the Summer Student World Championships, were organised by the Confederation Internationale des Etudiants (CIE) and held in Paris, France. Held from 9–17 August, a total of 300 athletes from 16 nations competed in the programme of five sports, including: athletics, fencing, association football, swimming and tennis. Women competed in swimming events only.

Athletics medal summary

Athletics medal table

Participating nations

References
World Student Games (Pre-Universiade) - GBR Athletics 

Summer World University Games
Athletics at the Summer Universiade
Summer Student World Championships
Summer Student World Championships
Summer Student World Championships
International sports competitions hosted by Paris
Athletics in Paris
Multi-sport events in France
Summer Student World Championships
Summer Student World Championships